The esterilla is a traditional percussion instrument from Colombia. The esterilla consists of long, narrow pieces of wood woven together in a similar fashion as a placemat. The instrument is played by either bending it or rubbing it against itself. This instrument dates back to the 1960s.

References

South American percussion instruments
Colombian musical instruments
1960s in music